Earl Wilson (born September 13, 1958) is a former American football defensive end who played two seasons with the San Diego Chargers of the National Football League. He played college football at the University of Kentucky and attended Atlantic City High School in Atlantic City, New Jersey. He was also a member of the Toronto Argonauts of the Canadian Football League.

References

External links
Just Sports Stats

1958 births
Living people
Atlantic City High School alumni
Players of American football from New Jersey
American football defensive ends
Canadian football defensive linemen
African-American players of American football
African-American players of Canadian football
Kentucky Wildcats football players
Toronto Argonauts players
San Diego Chargers players
Sportspeople from Long Branch, New Jersey
Sportspeople from Monmouth County, New Jersey
21st-century African-American people
20th-century African-American sportspeople